Marci Rodgers is an American costume designer for film, television and stage. She is best known for her work on Till, Wu-Tang: An American Saga, High Flying Bird and BlacKkKlansman.

Life and career
Rodgers was born in Evanston, Illinois. After graduating with a BBA from Howard University, she assisted costume designer Reggie Ray in several Broadway plays. In 2015, Spike Lee hired her as a production assistant on Chi-Raq. She then obtained her MFA in Costume Design from the University of Maryland in 2016.

Rodgers is a member of the Academy of Motion Picture Arts and Sciences, voting in the costume designers branch.

Filmography

Film
 2022: Till
 2021: No Sudden Move
 2021: Passing
 2020: Lost Girls
 2019: The Day Shall Come
 2019: High Flying Bird
 2018: BlacKkKlansman
 2018: Pass Over

Television
 2022: Paper Girls
 2019: Wu-Tang: An American Saga
 2017–2019 : She's Gotta Have It

Awards and nominations

References

External links
 
 

Living people
American costume designers
Women costume designers
American fashion designers
American women fashion designers
21st-century American women
Year of birth missing (living people)
Place of birth missing (living people)